The 2015–16 Tunisian Ligue Professionnelle 3 (Tunisian Professional League) was competed by 42 teams divided in 3 groups of 14 teams each. The winner of each group is promoted to 2016–17 Tunisian Ligue Professionnelle 2, while the three last teams of each group are relegated to the Tunisian Ligue 4.

Teams

North Group
 AS Mhamdia
 AS Oued Ellil
 AS Soliman
 AS Soukra
 Club Medjezien
 CO Transports
 Dahmani AC
 ES Radès
 JS El Omrane
 JS Soukra
 SS Ksour
 Stade Africain Menzel Bourguiba
 US Bousalem
 VS Menzel Abderrahmane

Center Group
 Ahly Bouhjar
 AS Jelma
 CS Bembla
 CS Hajeb Laayoun
 CS Hilalien
 CS Makthar
 Enfida Sports
 ES Djemmal
 ES Haffouz
 ES Beni-Khalled
 ES Fahs
 HS Kalâa Kebira
 Kalâa Sport
 Stade Nabeulien

South Group
 Club olympique de Médenine
 CS Chebba
 CS Redeyef
 Espoir Sportif de Jerba Midoun
 ES Feriana
 FC Mdhilla
 LPS Tozeur
 Océano Club de Kerkennah
 PS Sakiet Daier
 Sporting Club Moknine
 SS Gafsa
 US Djerba Ajim
 US Ksour Essef
 US Métouia

Standings

North Group table

Center Group table

South Group table

See also
2015–16 Tunisian Ligue Professionnelle 1
2015–16 Tunisian Ligue Professionnelle 2
2015–16 Tunisian Cup

External links
 2015–16 Ligue 3 on RSSSF.com
 Fédération Tunisienne de Football website
 Ligue 3

Tunisian Ligue Professionnelle 3